Saldías is a railway station located at the boundary between the Recoleta and Palermo barrios of Buenos Aires, Argentina. The station is part of Belgrano Norte Line, between Retiro and Ciudad Universitaria stations. It is currently operated by both companies, private Ferrovías (for regular services) and state-owned Trenes Argentinos (for differential services only, served by Emepa Alerce DMUs). The station is named after Argentinian historian, lawyer, politician, soldier and diplomat Adolfo Saldías.

See also
 Belgrano Norte Line
 Ferrovías

References

Railway stations in Buenos Aires
Railway stations opened in 1912